Diego da Costa Lima (born 30 September 1988 in Duque de Caxias, Rio de Janeiro) is a Brazilian footballer who plays as a midfielder.

References

External links

1988 births
Living people
People from Duque de Caxias, Rio de Janeiro
Brazilian footballers
Association football midfielders
Football League (Greece) players
Süper Lig players
TFF First League players
Primeira Liga players
Liga Portugal 2 players
Moldovan Super Liga players
Diego Lima
Ykkönen players
Saudi First Division League players
Associação Atlética Portuguesa (RJ) players
Audax Rio de Janeiro Esporte Clube players
Rio Branco Esporte Clube players
Kastoria F.C. players
Akhisarspor footballers
Atlético Clube de Portugal players
Boavista F.C. players
FC Zimbru Chișinău players
Diego Lima
Diego Lima
Diego Lima
AC Kajaani players
Hetten FC players
Brazilian expatriate footballers
Expatriate footballers in Greece
Expatriate footballers in Turkey
Expatriate footballers in Portugal
Expatriate soccer players in the United States
Expatriate footballers in Moldova
Expatriate footballers in Thailand
Expatriate footballers in Finland
Expatriate footballers in Saudi Arabia
Brazilian expatriate sportspeople in Turkey
Brazilian expatriate sportspeople in Portugal
Brazilian expatriate sportspeople in Greece
Brazilian expatriate sportspeople in the United States
Brazilian expatriate sportspeople in Moldova
Brazilian expatriate sportspeople in Thailand
Brazilian expatriate sportspeople in Finland
Brazilian expatriate sportspeople in Saudi Arabia
Sportspeople from Rio de Janeiro (state)